San Juan, Spanish for Saint John, may refer to:

Places

Argentina 
 San Juan Province, Argentina
 San Juan, Argentina, the capital of that province
 San Juan, Salta, a village in Iruya, Salta Province
 San Juan (Buenos Aires Underground), a metro station

Chile 
 San Juan de la Costa, a commune of Chile

Colombia 
 San Juan de Arama, a town and municipality in Meta Department
 San Juan de Rioseco, a town and municipality in Cundinamarca Department
 San Juan del Cesar, town and municipality in La Guajira Department

Costa Rica 
 San Juan de Tibás, the capital city of the canton of Tibás, San José Province
 San Juan District (disambiguation), a list of places in Costa Rica

Cuba 
 Pico San Juan
 San Juan Hill
 San Juan de los Yeras (Villa Clara Province)

Dominican Republic 
 San Juan Province (Dominican Republic)
 San Juan de la Maguana

Guatemala 
 San Juan Atitán
 San Juan Ixcoy

Honduras 
 San Juan, Intibucá
 San Juan, La Paz

Mexico 
 Colonia San Juan, Mexico City
 San Juan Chamula, Chiapas
 San Juan de los Lagos, Jalisco
 San Juan de Ulúa, a small island near the port of Veracruz
 San Juan del Río, Querétaro
 San Juan Market, Mexico City
 Nuevo San Juan Parangaricutiro, Michoacán

Oaxaca
San Juan Achiutla
San Juan Atepec
San Juan Cacahuatepec
San Juan Chicomezúchil
San Juan Chilateca
San Juan Cieneguilla
San Juan Coatzospam
San Juan Colorado
San Juan Comaltepec
San Juan Cotzocón
San Juan del Estado
San Juan de los Cues
San Juan del Río, Oaxaca
San Juan Diuxi
San Juan Guelavía
San Juan Guichicovi
San Juan Ihualtepec
San Juan Juquila Mixes
San Juan Juquila Vijanos
San Juan Lachao
San Juan Lachigalla
San Juan Lajarcia
San Juan Lalana
San Juan Mazatlán
San Juan Mixtepec, Mixteca
San Juan Mixtepec, Miahuatlán
San Juan Ñumí
San Juan Ozolotepec
San Juan Petlapa
San Juan Quiahije
San Juan Quiotepec
San Juan Sayultepec
San Juan Tabaá
San Juan Tamazola
San Juan Teita
San Juan Teitipac
San Juan Tepeuxila
San Juan Teposcolula
San Juan Yaeé
San Juan Yatzona
San Juan Yucuita

Nicaragua 
 San Juan del Sur

Panama 
San Juan, Chiriquí
San Juan, Colón
San Juan de Dios
San Juan, Veraguas

Peru 
 San Juan (mountain)
 San Juan District (disambiguation), a list of places in Peru

Philippines 
 San Juan, Abra
 San Juan, Batangas
 San Juan, Ilocos Sur
 San Juan, La Union
 San Juan, Metro Manila
 San Juan, San Jose, Camarines Sur
 San Juan, San Jose, Dinagat Islands
 San Juan, Siquijor
 San Juan, Southern Leyte
 San Juan, Surigao City

Spain 
Sant Joan d'Alacant
Sant Joan, Majorca

Trinidad and Tobago 
 San Juan–Laventille, a region
 San Juan, Trinidad and Tobago

United States 

 San Juan, California, former name of North San Juan, California
 San Juan Bautista, California
 San Juan Capistrano, California
 San Juan County, Colorado
 San Juan Mountains, Colorado
 San Juan del Puerto, Florida
 San Juan, Nevada
 San Juan, New Mexico
 San Juan County, New Mexico
 Pueblo de San Juan, in New Mexico
 San Juan, Texas
 San Juan, Starr County, Texas
 San Juan Basin, in the Southwestern United States
 San Juan County (disambiguation)
 San Juan Islands, an archipelago in Washington
 San Juan Island, the second-largest of the San Juan Islands

Puerto Rico 
 San Juan, Puerto Rico
 San Juan Bay

Venezuela 
 San Juan de Los Cayos
 San Juan de Manapiare
 San Juan de Payara

People with the surname 
 E. San Juan Jr. (born 1938), Filipino writer
 Olga San Juan (1927–2009), American actress
 Rossana San Juan (born 1969), Mexican actress and singer

Ships 
 ARA San Juan (S-42), a submarine of the Argentine Navy that disappeared in November 2017 in the South Atlantic
 San Juan Bautista (ship), a Japanese-built galleon
 San Juan de Silicia, a ship in the Spanish Armada that sunk off the Isle of Mull, in Scotland
 USS San Juan, various ships of the United States Navy

Transportation

Airports
 San Juan Airport (Bolivia), Bolivia
 Luis Muñoz Marín International Airport, also known as San Juan International Airport, Puerto Rico

Other transportation
 San Juan Airlines, an airline in Washington, United States
 San Juan Express, passenger train on the narrow-gauge Denver and Rio Grande Western Railroad in Colorado and New Mexico
 San Juan station, rapid transit station in Lima, Peru

Other uses 
 San Juan (card game) by Andreas Seyfarth, a card game for two to four players
 San Juan, a Peruvian beer brewed by Backus and Johnston
 San Juan, the Honduran name of the Gold Tree (Tabebuia donnell-smithii)
 Fiesta de San Juan, the Spanish name for Saint John's Eve
 San Juan Festival, celebrated in Moyobamba, Peru

See also 
 San Juan Bautista (disambiguation)
 San Juan Cathedral (disambiguation)
 San Juan High School (disambiguation)
 San Juan del Río (disambiguation)
 San Juan River (disambiguation)
 Saint-Jean (disambiguation)
 Saint John (disambiguation)
 Saint Juan (disambiguation)
 Sant Joan (disambiguation)
 São João (disambiguation)